Hansee is an electronica musician from Tønsberg, Norway. He discovered Protracker on Amiga 500 creating chiptunes with 4 channels. In 1999 FastTracker 2 on PC with the possibility of 32 channels was used until he in 2004 converted to Mac and Renoise.

In 2012 Hansee released his first official album called Fragments.

References

Norwegian electronic musicians
Tracker musicians
Musicians from Tønsberg